The 1934–35 Scottish Cup was the 57th staging of Scotland's most prestigious football knockout competition. The Cup was won by Rangers who defeated Hamilton Academical in the final.

Fourth round

Semi-finals

Replays

Final

Teams

See also
1934–35 in Scottish football

References

External links
 Video clip of the final, by Pathé News

Scottish Cup seasons
Cup
Scot